, often referred to as "Asano", is a private boys' school located in Yokohama, Kanagawa, Japan

General 
, often referred to as "Asano", is a private boys' school located in Yokohama, Kanagawa, Japan. Asano Sōichirō (the founder of Asano zaibatsu) and Asano zaibatsu (Asano Conglomerate) founded this school in 1920. The Academy consists of Asano Junior High School (Grades 7-9) and Asano Senior High School (Grades 10-12) with approximately 800 students respectively. Admission to the Junior High School is highly competitive. Every year, 270 out of approximately 1800 applicants are selected for admission, based on their scores during entrance examinations. Asano Junior and Senior high school students, between the ages of 13-18, spend six years at the school.  The school motto is, “Rise again every time you fall.” Asano High School is ranked #12 in Japan in 2021.

Clubs 
At the Asano Academy, there are more than 30 clubs to choose from. Club practice takes place after classes (frequency depending on each club).  Clubs are Soccer, Track and Field, Baseball, American Football, Table Tennis, Climbing, Boxing, Archery, Judo, Badminton, Rugby, Tennis, Swimming, Basketball, Kendo, Handball, Volleyball, Go and Shogi, Brass Band, Chemistry, Drama, Journalism (School Paper), Fine Arts, History Study, Geology, Railway Research, Japan Red Cross, Biology, Physics, Juggling, Debate, Reading and Japanese Calligraphy.  The Graduation ceremony is held in March.

Facilities 
The school property is 58,655m².

school library of about 70000 books

an auditorium

a gymnastic hall

an indoor swimming pool (closed in winter)

a school field of artificial turf

two tennis courts

two handball courts

A huge Statue of Asano Soichiro is a symbol of the School.

External links 
 Asano High School
 浅野学園　浅野中学・高等学校

References 

Junior high schools in Japan
Boys' schools in Japan
Private schools in Japan